Winooski is the name of the following places in the United States:

Winooski, Vermont, city
Winooski, Wisconsin, ghost town
Winooski Falls Mill District, historical district
Winooski River, river
Winooski Turnpike, road

See also
Winooski 44, American political protest group